The Cascades is a manmade waterfall attraction in Sparks Foundation County Park, Jackson, Michigan.  The falls are both illuminated and choreographed and is the site of concerts and special events from Memorial Day to Labor Day.  Three times a year, Memorial Day, Independence Day, and Labor Day, fireworks displays are presented at the Cascade Falls.  Since its creation in 1932, millions of people have enjoyed the beauty of The Cascades.

Features
In the spring of 2013, the 1,230 incandescent bulbs in the falls were replaced with 90 LED rope lights. These lights are accompanied by a variety of music. There are 126 steps along each side of the falls allowing visitors access to the top. This walkway passes the three reflecting pools.

The Cascade Falls are operated by the Jackson County Parks Department. They are open nightly from 8:30 p.m. to 11:00 p.m., Memorial Day through Labor Day.

History
The Cascade Falls were built in 1932. They are the result of William Sparks' dream to do something for the people of Jackson and to build an attraction that would provide visitors with a positive impression of the city.

Directly west of the Sparks home was swampy bog land.  Mr. Sparks' original plan was to acquire the property and convert it into a skating pond.  His vision grew, and soon included plans called for the development of a park which would include a golf course, lagoons, canal, toboggan slides, landscaped grounds, picnic areas, a clubhouse, and the Cascades.  The William and Matilda Sparks Foundation was created in the fall of 1929 to develop the land into a recreation spot and meditation center.

Magic Fountain of Montjuïc in Barcelona, Spain served as Sparks’ inspiration for the Cascade Falls. After experimenting with a scale model, a contract was awarded to the North-Moller Construction Company on October 17, 1931. The contract required that the job be completed by April 26, 1932, that Jackson labor be used, and that married men be shown preference. Work continued on schedule throughout the winter, and the falls opened to a crowd of 25,000 people on May 9, 1932, Captain Spark's 59th birthday.

Within a few years, the Cascade Falls were known around the world. Today, the visitor logbooks include entries from every state and from 33 countries.

Renovations

The original "Save the Cascades" was in 1969-1970 after the falls had fallen into disrepair and vandalism. The Falls amphitheater was built and the grounds enclosed to protect the Falls from vandalism.  The "Cascades Rebirth" was in 1982–1983. New computerized lighting systems and new sound systems were installed.  The next Cascades project was in 1992–1993. Extensive concrete repairs were done, new walkways added, and a new filtered and chlorinated well water system installed. In May 2013, new LED lights were installed to replace the aging incandescent light system. In addition, a new computer system for music and light choreography was put in place.  It replaces the outdated system that required cassette tapes to change the lights and music. In December 2014, phase one of a six phase project began by tearing down the 150 foot concrete wall originally built in 1970 to keep vandals out. The large concrete wall blocked the view of the falls from the street. In the spring of 2015 the wall will be replaced with a more permanent archway and fence. Phase two will include fixing the heart of the waterfall, including the mechanical, electrical and plumbing. Phase three will include fixing the concrete steps up to the top of the structure and concrete fencing around the stairway. Phase four and five will include repair work to the fountains and plaza.

See also
Grand Haven Musical Fountain

References

Buildings and structures completed in 1932
Buildings and structures in Jackson County, Michigan
Waterfalls of Michigan
Tourist attractions in Jackson County, Michigan
Landforms of Jackson County, Michigan
Artificial landforms
1932 establishments in Michigan